HP EliteBook is a line of business-oriented high-end notebooks and mobile workstations made by Hewlett-Packard (HP Inc.). The EliteBook series, which fits above the lower-end ProBook series, was introduced in August 2008 as a replacement of the HP Compaq high end line of notebooks. The EliteBook brand included mobile workstations until September 2013, when they were rebranded as HP ZBook. The EliteBook mainly competes against computer lineups such as Acer's TravelMate, Dell's Latitude and Precision, Lenovo's ThinkPad and Toshiba's Portégé and Tecra.

Features

The HP EliteBook line is engineered to meet military MIL-STD-810 standards for reliability and performance under extreme conditions, namely for temperature, altitude, humidity, dust, shock and vibration. The notebooks feature a magnesium alloy chassis, anodized aluminum lid and palm rests, spill-resistant keyboards, active hard-drive protection and dual pointing devices (touchpad and pointing stick). Earlier EliteBook models featured the HP Night Light keyboard light, while in subsequent generations HP has added a backlit keyboard option to some 15" and 17" workstation models. Select models have SSD storage options.

History
Announcements:
 2008: August 11: 8530p, 8530w and 8730w; August 18: 2530p and 2730p; September 8: 6930p announced
 2010: January 6: 8440p, 8440w, 8540p and 8540w; March 1: 2540p and 2740p; March 24: 8740w announced
 2011: February 23: 8460p and 8560p; April 12: 8460w, 8560w and 8760w; May 9: 2560p and 2760p announced
 2012: May 9: 2170p, 2570p, 8470p and 8570p, 8470w, 8570w and 8770w, Folio 9470m announced
 2013: October 1: 820G1, 840G1 and 850G1; December 10: Folio 1040G1 announced
 2014: June 4: 725G2, 745G2 and 755G2; December 2: 720, 740, 750, 820G2, 840G2, 850G2 and Folio 1020 announced
 2015: September 29: 725G3, 745G3 and 755G3 announced
 2016: January 5: 820G3, FolioG1, 840G3, 1040G3 and 850G3 announced.
 2020: January 5: HP Elite DragonflyG2; May 26: EliteBook 830G7, x360 830G7, 840G7, 850G7, 835G7, 845G7, 855G7, x360 1030G7 and x360 1040G7 announced. December 7: EliteBook 830G8, x360 830G8, 840G8, 850G8

Models

The first generation of EliteBooks was the xx30 series. Before that, HP's p- and w-class (professional and workstation, respectively) notebooks were not branded as EliteBooks, nor did they have the EliteBooks' distinctive anodized aluminum styling.

First generation

The xx30 generation comprised the following notebooks:
 2530p: 12.1" ultraportable
 2730p: 12.1" Tablet PC
 6930p: 14.1" mainstream
 8530p: 15.4" mainstream
 8530w: 15.4" mobile workstation
 8730w: 17.0" mobile workstation

All models used Intel Core 2 CPUs and 16:10 aspect ratio displays. The 6930p model was notable for being claimed by HP to be the first notebook to break the 24-hour battery life barrier.

Second generation

The xx40 series comprised the following models:
 2540p: 12.1" ultraportable
 2740p: 12.1" Tablet PC
 8440p: 14.0" mainstream
 8440w: 14.0" mobile workstation
 8540p: 15.6" mainstream
 8540w: 15.6" mobile workstation
 8740w: 17.0" mobile workstation

The xx40 series brought several changes and new features, including upgrading to the new Intel Core i5 and Core i7 processors and DDR3 SDRAM, new semi-chiclet keyboard and for the 14.0" and 15.6" models the switch from 16:10 to 16:9 displays. HP also added DisplayPort and USB 3.0 ports. Appearance-wise, the workstation models were changed to a darker "gunmetal" finish while the non-workstation models retained the brighter "silver" finish.

Models with quad-core CPUs supported up to 32 GB of RAM. Workstation models could be configured with ISV-certified professional graphics cards such as the ATI FirePro M7820 or the Nvidia Quadro FX 5000M (at the time of release the most powerful workstation-class graphics card on the market).

Third generation

The xx60 series, announced on February 23, 2011, comprised the following models:
 2560p: 12.5" ultraportable
 2760p: 12.1" Tablet PC
 8460p: 14.0" mainstream
 8460w: 14.0" mobile workstation
 8560p: 15.6" mainstream
 8560w: 15.6" mobile workstation
 8760w: 17.3" mobile workstation

The xx60 series featured second-generation Intel Core i series processors, a choice of Sandy Bridge integrated or AMD Radeon HD 6470M discrete graphics and chiclet-style keyboards. All models except the 2760p used 16:9 displays. Mobile workstation models featured Nvidia Quadro or AMD FirePro graphics. The notebooks were also completely redesigned, with a more boxy shape and less plastic used on the surfaces, as well as a larger glass touchpad. The multiple access panels on the bottom of the notebooks were replaced with a single panel enabling access to all of the internal components.

The 8460p model was claimed to have battery life in excess of 32 hours using an external ultra-capacity battery.

Fourth generation

The fourth generation, announced on May 9, 2012, comprised the following models:
 Revolve 810: 11.6" Tablet PC
 2170p: 11.6" ultraportable
 2570p: 12.5" ultraportable
 8470p: 14.0" mainstream
 8470w: 14.0" mobile workstation
 Folio 9470m: 14.0" ultrabook
 8570p: 15.6" mainstream
 8570w: 15.6" mobile workstation
 8770w: 17.3" mobile workstation

The xx70 series was largely an incremental update to the previous xx60 series, updated with Intel Ivy Bridge processors and new integrated and discrete graphics processors. New additions to the EliteBook family included the 11.6" 2170p and the 14.0" Folio 9470m ultrabook.

ElitePad 900 G1 was introduced with this generation in October 2012.

Fifth generation

This generation of EliteBook notebooks feature Intel Haswell processors or AMD Steamroller Kaveri processors. EliteBook 800 Series G1 products with Intel processors were announced in October 2013. EliteBook Folio 1040 G1 and Revolve 810 G2 were announced in December 2013. EliteBook 700 Series G1 products with Intel processors and 700 Series G2 products with AMD processors were announced in June 2014. This generation brought changes to nomenclature on most products. Models ending with 0 use Intel processors and models ending with 5 use AMD processor. The second last digit relates to the screen size, and the remaining digits indicate the series. G number indicates generation of the product. The external design was also refreshed, resulting in a less boxy shape and overall thinner chassis. Workstation models were split into a separate ZBook brand. AMD based models were added into EliteBook product line-up for the first time. Previously, ProBook product line-up had featured AMD APUs.

 EliteBook 720 G1: 12.5" ultraportable with Intel processor
 EliteBook 740 G1: 14.0" mainstream with Intel processor
 EliteBook 750 G1: 15.6" mainstream with Intel processor
 EliteBook 725 G2: 12.5" ultraportable with AMD processor
 EliteBook 745 G2: 14.0" mainstream with AMD processor
 EliteBook 755 G2: 15.6" mainstream with AMD processor
 EliteBook Revolve 810 G2: 11.6" tablet with Intel processor
 EliteBook 820 G1: 12.5" ultraportable with Intel processor
 EliteBook 840 G1: 14.0" mainstream with Intel processor
 EliteBook 850 G1: 15.6" mainstream with Intel processor
 EliteBook Folio 1040 G1: 14.0" ultrabook with Intel processor
 EliteBook Folio 9480m : 14.0" ultrabook with Intel processor

ElitePad 1000 G2 tablet with Intel processors was introduced with this generation. The product was announced at WMC 2014 in February 2014.

 ElitePad 1000 G2: 10.1" tablet with Intel processor

Sixth generation
This generation of EliteBook notebooks feature Intel Broadwell processors. EliteBook 700 Series G2, Revolve 810 G3, 800 Series G2, Folio 1020 G1, and Folio 1040 G2 were announced in December 2014. EliteBook Folio 1020 Bang & Olufsen Limited Edition was announced in July 2015.

 EliteBook 720 G2: 12.5" mainstream with Intel processor
 EliteBook 740 G2: 14.0" mainstream with Intel processor
 EliteBook 750 G2: 15.6" mainstream with Intel processor
 EliteBook Revolve 810 G3: 11.6" tablet with Intel processor
 EliteBook 820 G2: 12.5" mainstream with Intel processor
 EliteBook 840 G2: 14.0" mainstream with Intel processor
 EliteBook 850 G2: 15.6" mainstream with Intel processor
 EliteBook Folio 1020 G1 Standard/Special Edition/Bang & Olufsen Limited Edition: 12.5" lightweight with Intel processor
 EliteBook Folio 1040 G2: 14.0" lightweight with Intel processor

HP Elite x2 1011 G1 tablet with Intel processors was introduced with this generation. The product was announced in January 2015.

 Elite x2 1011 G1: 11.6" tablet with Intel processor

Seventh generation
This generation of EliteBook notebooks feature Intel Skylake processors or AMD Excavator Carrizo processors. EliteBook 725 G3, 745 G3 and 755 G3 with AMD processors were announced in September 2015. EliteBook 820 G3, 840 G3, 850 G3, 1040 G3 and Folio G1 with Intel processors were announced at CES 2016 in January 2016. EliteBook 1030 G1 was announced in May 2016.

 EliteBook 725 G3: 12.5" mainstream with AMD processor
 EliteBook 745 G3: 14.0" mainstream with AMD processor
 EliteBook 755 G3: 15.6" mainstream with AMD processor
 EliteBook 820 G3: 12.5" mainstream with Intel processor
 EliteBook 840 G3: 14.0" mainstream with Intel processor
 EliteBook 850 G3: 15.6" mainstream with Intel processor
 EliteBook Folio G1: 12.5" lightweight with Intel processor
 EliteBook 1030 G1: 13.3" lightweight with Intel processor
 EliteBook 1040 G3: 14.0" lightweight with Intel processor

HP Elite x2 1012 G1 tablet with Intel processors was introduced with this generation. The product was announced in November 2015.

 Elite x2 1012 G1: 12.0" tablet with Intel processor

Eighth generation

This generation of EliteBook notebooks feature Intel Kaby Lake processors or AMD Excavator Bristol Ridge processors. EliteBook 725 G4, 745 G4 and 755 G4 with AMD processors were announced in November 2016. EliteBook 820 G4, 840 G4 and 850 G4 with Intel processors were announced in December 2016. EliteBook x360 1030 G2 was announced at CES 2017 in January 2017. EliteBook x360 1020 G2 and 1040 G4 were announced in September 2017. A refresh model, EliteBook 840r G4, was released in April 2018 with Intel Kaby Lake R processors as options.

 EliteBook 725 G4: 12.5" mainstream with AMD processor
 EliteBook 745 G4: 14.0" mainstream with AMD processor
 EliteBook 755 G4: 15.6" mainstream with AMD processor
 EliteBook 820 G4: 12.5" mainstream with Intel processor
 EliteBook 840 G4: 14.0" mainstream with Intel processor
 EliteBook 850 G4: 15.6" mainstream with Intel processor
 EliteBook 840r G4: 14.0" mainstream with Intel processor
 EliteBook x360 1020 G2: 12.5" lightweight convertible with Intel processor
 EliteBook x360 1030 G2: 13.3" lightweight convertible with Intel processor
 EliteBook 1040 G4: 14.0" lightweight with Intel processor

HP Elite x2 1012 G2 tablet with Intel processors was introduced with this generation. The product was announced in May 2017.

 Elite x2 1012 G2: 12.3" tablet with Intel processor

Ninth generation

This generation of EliteBook notebooks feature Intel Kaby Lake, Kaby Lake R and Coffee Lake processors or AMD Zen Raven Ridge processors. EliteBook 830 G5, 840 G5 and 850 G5 with Intel Core processors were announced in February 2018. EliteBook 735 G5, 745 G5 and 755 G5 with AMD processors were announced in May 2018. EliteBook 1050 G1 with Intel Coffee Lake processors was also announced in May 2018. One of the two lightweight convertibles, EliteBook x360 1030 G3 was announced in May 2018, and followed by EliteBook x360 1040 G5 announced in October 2018. Another convertible, EliteBook x360 830 G5, was announced at CES 2019 in January 2019. The EliteBook x360 1020 model was discontinued in this generation.

 EliteBook 735 G5: 13.3" mainstream with AMD processor
 EliteBook 745 G5: 14.0" mainstream with AMD processor
 EliteBook 755 G5: 15.6" Mainstream with AMD processor
 EliteBook x360 830 G5: 13.3" mainstream convertible with Intel processor
 EliteBook 830 G5: 13.3" mainstream with Intel processor
 EliteBook 840 G5: 14.0" mainstream with Intel processor
 EliteBook 850 G5: 15.6" mainstream with Intel processor
 EliteBook x360 1030 G3: 13.3" lightweight convertible with Intel processor
 EliteBook x360 1040 G5: 14.0" lightweight convertible with Intel processor
 EliteBook 1050 G1: 15.6" lightweight with Intel processor

HP Elite x2 1013 G3 tablet with Intel processors was introduced with this generation. The product was announced in May 2018.
 Elite x2 1013 G3: 13" tablet with Intel processor

Tenth generation

This generation of EliteBook notebooks feature Intel Whiskey Lake processors or AMD Zen+ Picasso processors. EliteBook x360 830 G6, 830 G6, 840 G6, and 850 G6 with Intel Core processors were announced in April 2019. EliteBook x360 1030 G4 and x360 1040 G6 with Intel Core processors were announced in May 2019. Elitebook 735 G6 and 745 G6 with AMD Ryzen Pro processors were announced in June 2019. New features introduced in this generation include optional 1000-nit display, privacy camera shutter, 802.11ax WiFi and Bluetooth 5.

 EliteBook 735 G6: 13.3" mainstream with AMD processor
 EliteBook 745 G6: 14.0" mainstream with AMD processor
 EliteBook x360 830 G6: 13.3" mainstream convertible with Intel processor
 EliteBook 830 G6: 13.3" mainstream with Intel processor
 EliteBook 840 G6: 14.0" mainstream with Intel processor
 EliteBook 850 G6: 15.6" mainstream with Intel processor
 EliteBook x360 1030 G4: 13.3" lightweight convertible with Intel processor
 EliteBook x360 1040 G6: 14.0" lightweight convertible with Intel processor

Other HP Elite notebook and tablet products introduced with this generation include Elite x2 G4 and Elite Dragonfly. Elite x2 G4 was announced in May 2019 with EliteBook x360 convertibles. Elite Dragonfly was announced in September 2019.

 Elite x2 G4: 12.3" or 13" tablet with Intel processor
 Elite Dragonfly: 13.3" ultra-lightweight convertible with Intel processor

Eleventh generation

This generation of EliteBook notebooks feature Intel Comet Lake and AMD Zen 2 Renoir processors. New features introduced in this generation include 5G NR WWAN. Elitebook 805 series G7, 800 series G7, 1030 G7 and 1040 G7 were announced in May 2020.

 EliteBook x360 830 G7: 13.3" mainstream convertible with Intel processor
 EliteBook 830 G7: 13.3" mainstream with Intel processor
 EliteBook 840 G7: 14.0" mainstream with Intel processor
 EliteBook 850 G7: 15.6" mainstream with Intel processor
 EliteBook 835 G7: 13.3" mainstream with AMD processor
 EliteBook 845 G7: 14.0" mainstream with AMD processor
 EliteBook 855 G7: 15.6" mainstream with AMD processor
 EliteBook x360 1030 G7: 13.3" lightweight convertible with Intel processor
 EliteBook x360 1040 G7: 14.0" lightweight convertible with Intel processor

Elite Dragonfly was updated with Intel 10th Generation processors at CES 2020 in January 2020.

 Elite Dragonfly: 13.3" ultra-lightweight convertible with Intel processor

Twelfth generation
This generation of EliteBook notebooks feature Intel Tiger Lake processors. EliteBook 800 series G8 was announced in December 2020. EliteBook 840 Aero G8, x360 1030 G8, and x360 1040 G8 with Intel processors, as well as EliteBook 805 G8 series with AMD processors were announced on CES 2021.

 EliteBook x360 830 G8: 13.3" mainstream convertible with Intel processor
 EliteBook 830 G8: 13.3" mainstream with Intel processor
 EliteBook 840 Aero G8: 14.0" with Intel processor
 EliteBook 840 G8: 14.0" mainstream with Intel processor
 EliteBook 850 G8: 15.6" mainstream with Intel processor
 EliteBook 835 G8: 13.3" mainstream with AMD processor
 EliteBook 845 G8: 14.0" mainstream with AMD processor
 EliteBook 855 G8: 15.6" mainstream with AMD processor
 EliteBook x360 1030 G8: 13.3" with Intel processor
 EliteBook x360 1040 G8: 14.0" with Intel processor

Other HP Elite notebook, tablet and accessory products are introduced at CES 2021.
 HP Elite Dragonfly G2
 HP Elite Dragonfly Max
 HP Elite Folio
 HP Elite x2 G8
 HP Elite Wireless Earbuds

HP Dev One

HP Dev One is a Linux laptop designed by HP in collaboration with System76 and AMD, available since June 2022.  HP Dev One's design is based on the HP EliteBook 845 G8.  Pop! OS is preinstalled on the Dev One.  The laptop is designed for software developers, and includes a Super key in place of the traditional Windows key.  Additionally, the maximum display brightness is 1000 nits but premium-branded speaker technology is not included.

Thirteenth generation
This generation of EliteBook notebooks feature Intel Alder Lake processors. EliteBook 800 series G9 was announced in January 2022. The EliteBook 800 G9 series with Intel processors and EliteBook 805 G9 series with AMD processors were announced at CES 2022. This generation also brings the previous ProBook 600 and ProBook 605 series into the EliteBook lineup.

 HP EliteBook 630 G9: 13.3" with Intel processor
 HP EliteBook 640 G9: 14.0" with Intel processor
 HP EliteBook 650 G9: 15.6" with Intel processor
 HP EliteBook 635 G9: 13.3" with AMD processor
 HP EliteBook 645 G9: 14.0" with AMD Processor
 HP EliteBook 655 G9: 15.6" with AMD processor
 HP EliteBook 830 G9: 13.3" mainstream with Intel processor
 HP Elite x360 830 G9: 13.3" mainstream convertible with Intel processor
 HP EliteBook 840 G9: 14.0" mainstream with Intel processor
 HP EliteBook 860 G9: 16.0" mainstream with Intel processor
 HP EliteBook 835 G9: 13.3" mainstream with AMD processor
 HP EliteBook 845 G9: 14.0" mainstream with AMD Processor
 HP EliteBook 865 G9: 16.0" mainstream with AMD processor
 HP EliteBook 1040 G9: 14.0" premium with Intel processor
 HP Elite x360 1040 G9: 14.0" premium convertible with Intel processor

Other HP Elite notebook, tablet and accessory products introduced at CES 2022.

 HP Elite Dragonfly G3: 13.5" business premium with Intel processor
 HP Elite Dragonfly Chromebook: Premium business Chromebook with Intel processor
 HP Elite Dragonfly Chromebook Enterprise: Premium business Chromebook with Intel processor

Reception
The HP Elitebook line has been positively received, with PC Mag giving the 6930p notebook a four out of five star review, noting its performance in all-around computing, but giving higher praise to the Thinkpad T400. The 2730p Tablet PC was well received by GottaBeMobile, but noted shortcomings in its speakers, buttons, and latches. Notebook Review called the 8530w mobile workstations "one of the most impressive workstation-class 15.4" notebooks", and Desktop Engineering found that, "In terms of price, performance, and portability, the HP EliteBook 8530w is a winner."

Geek.com commented: "In summary, you can’t go wrong with the EliteBook 8540p (or the 8xx0 series for that matter). With this flagship business line HP has combined good looks, ruggedness, high performance, and tons of features into one extremely attractive package." IT Reviews said that the 8540p's "relatively high screen resolution is a real draw, and we found the keyboard to be well made and easy to use at full touch-typing speed". However, the site also noted that "it is big and heavy and so not designed for portability, though. And it is expensive too."

The EliteBook 8440p received praise from V3.co.uk for its "attractive and robust design" as well as a "powerful processor" and "good range of features", but the review also noted that the overall appeal of the laptop was diminished by "poor battery life" and HP's choice of 32-bit Windows.

A review by AnandTech gave high scores to the HP EliteBook 8740w with the DreamColor 2 LCD, but noted a somewhat high price tag on built-to-order machines.

See also

HP ZBook
Dell Latitude and Precision
Lenovo ThinkPad
Acer TravelMate
List of Hewlett-Packard products

References

External links
 Elite Family, Hewlett Packard

EliteBook
Consumer electronics brands
2-in-1 PCs
Computer-related introductions in 2008
Mobile workstations
Business laptops